{{Automatic taxobox
|image = Gigaspora margarita.JPG
|image_caption = Gigaspora margarita
|taxon = Gigasporaceae
|authority = J.B. Morton & Benny
|type_genus = Gigaspora
|type_genus_authority = Gerd. & Trappe
|subdivision_ranks = Genera
|subdivision_ref = 
|subdivision = Cetraspora
Cetraspora helvetica
DentiscutataGigasporaGigaspora albidaGigaspora decipiensGigaspora giganteaGigaspora margaritaGigaspora roseaQuatunicaRacocetraRacocetra castaneaRacocetra coralloideaRacocetra fulgidaRacocetra gregariaRacocetra persicaRacocetra verrucosaRacocetra weresubiaeScutellosporaScutellospora biornataScutellospora calosporaScutellospora cerradensisScutellospora dipurpurascensScutellospora erythropusScutellospora gilmoreiScutellospora heterogamaScutellospora nigraScutellospora nodosaScutellospora pellucidaScutellospora reticulataScutellospora rubraScutellospora scutata}}

The Gigasporaceae are a family of fungi in the order Diversisporales. Species in this family are widespread in distribution, and form arbuscular mycorrhiza in roots. 

A species under Gigasporaceae is Gigaspora gigantea. The spores of G. gigantea'', found in specific sand dunes, commence in a healthy state of newly formed spores to dead and blackened in seven months through four identifiable steps: they begin as healthy greenish-yellow spores, turn into yellow with brown spots, then reddish-orange-brown, and ultimately dead. A cause of the symptoms of death in spores are soil organisms such as bacteria, protists, and microfauna.

References

Diversisporales
Fungus families